Chakkarat is a district (amphoe) in the eastern part of Nakhon Ratchasima province, northeastern Thailand.

History
In 1927 Tha Chang village was upgraded to a minor district (king amphoe) of Mueang Nakhon Ratchasima district. It was upgraded to a full district in 1953, and at the same time renamed from Tha Chang to Chakkarat. The district office was moved to Ban Talat Chakkarat in 1964.

Geography
Neighbouring districts are (from the north clockwise): Phimai and Huai Thalaeng of Nakhon Ratchasima Province; Nong Hong and Nong Ki of Buriram province; Nong Bun Mak, Chaloem Phra Kiat and Non Sung of Nakhon Ratchasima.

The main water resource is the Mun River.

Administration
The district is divided into eight sub-districts (tambons). Chakkarat itself has township (thesaban tambon) status and covers part of tambon Chakkarat.

Missing numbers are tambons which now form Chaloem Phra Kiat District.

Chakkarat